Federico Ortíz (born 24 February 1999) is an Argentine professional footballer who plays as a forward for Atlético de Rafaela.

Career
Ortíz had stints in the academies of River Plate, Newell's Old Boys, Belgrano and Atlético de Rafaela. It was Atlético de Rafaela who gave Ortíz his start in senior football. He was picked for his professional bow on 19 April 2019 by manager Juan Manuel Llop, who selected him off the substitutes bench in place of Mauro Albertengo after thirty-five minutes; the Primera B Nacional fixture ended drawn at 1–1.

Career statistics
.

References

External links

1999 births
Living people
People from San Francisco, Córdoba
Argentine footballers
Association football forwards
Primera Nacional players
Atlético de Rafaela footballers
Sportspeople from Córdoba Province, Argentina